Sir Thomas Wendy (8 February 1614 – 17 November 1673) was an English politician who sat in the House of Commons  in 1660.

Wendy was the son of  Francis Wendy. In 1629 he inherited the Haslingfield estate of his uncle Sir William Wendy. He was High Sheriff of Cambridgeshire and Huntingdonshire in 1638.

In 1660, Wendy was elected Member of Parliament for Cambridgeshire in the Convention Parliament.  He was knighted in 1661. He was re-elected MP for Cambridgeshire in 1661 for the Cavalier Parliament and sat until his death.

Wendy made a collection  of medals, optic glasses, and other rare items at Haslingfield Hall and also a considerable library. He  brought a Danish savant called Simon Ertman back from his travels, who helped to found the parish school.

Wendy died childless, at the age of 59. He settled most of his estates, including Haslingfield, on his nephew Thomas Stewart, son of his sister Susan and Thomas Stewart of Barton Mills. His executors gave his library to Balliol College, Oxford.

References

1614 births
1673 deaths
High Sheriffs of Cambridgeshire
High Sheriffs of Cambridgeshire and Huntingdonshire
English MPs 1660
English MPs 1661–1679